Folkestone and Hythe District Council is the local authority for the Folkestone and Hythe District in Kent, England. The district was called Shepway prior to 2018. The council is elected every four years. Since the last boundary changes in 2015, 30 councillors have been elected from 13 wards.

Political control
The first election to the council was held in 1973, initially operating as a shadow authority before coming into its powers on 1 April 1974. Political control of the council since 1973 has been held by the following parties:

Leadership
The leaders of the council since 1999 have been:

Council elections
1973 Shepway District Council election
1976 Shepway District Council election
1979 Shepway District Council election (New ward boundaries)
1983 Shepway District Council election
1987 Shepway District Council election (District boundary changes took place but the number of seats remained the same)
1991 Shepway District Council election
1995 Shepway District Council election
1999 Shepway District Council election
2003 Shepway District Council election (New ward boundaries reduced the number of seats by 10)
2007 Shepway District Council election
2011 Shepway District Council election
2015 Shepway District Council election (New ward boundaries)
2019 Folkestone & Hythe District Council election

By-election results

1995-1999

1999-2003

2003-2007

2007-2011

2011-2015

2015-2019

References

By-election results 

 
Folkestone and Hythe District
Council elections in Kent
District council elections in England